Battery Cheves is a historic artillery battery located at James Island, Charleston, South Carolina. It was built in 1863, and designed to protect the area between Fort Johnson and Battery Haskell. At the end of the war this battery mounted two pieces of heavy artillery. The earthen redoubt measures approximately 280 feet long and 240 feet deep. It has a 12-foot, 6 inch, high parapet wall and a powder magazine about 15 feet in height.

It was listed on the National Register of Historic Places in 1982.

References

Military facilities on the National Register of Historic Places in South Carolina
Military installations established in 1863
Buildings and structures in Charleston County, South Carolina
National Register of Historic Places in Charleston, South Carolina
American Civil War on the National Register of Historic Places